The Cangrejal River or Río Cangrejal is a river that drains several mountain tributaries and borders the rainforest of Pico Bonito National Park near La Ceiba, Honduras. The river offers some of the best whitewater rafting opportunities in Central America.

See also 
 List of rivers of Honduras

References 

Rivers of Honduras